Dorothy Belle Rupert is an American politician who served as a member in the Colorado Senate from the 18th district.

Early life 
On October 20, 1926, Rupert was born on a farm in Meadow Grove, Nebraska.

Education 
In 1948, Rupert earned a Bachelor of Arys degree from Nebraska Wesleyan University in Lincoln, Nebraska. In 1967, Rupert earned a master's degree in counseling and psych from University of Colorado Boulder. In 1993, Rupert earned a degree from Harvard University.

Career 
Rupert is a former teacher and counselor in Colorado public schools.

In 1958, Rupert became a member of the city council in Thornton, Colorado, until 1961.

In 2009, Rupert became a co-founder of Growing Up Boulder.

Awards 
 2016 Stan Black Award. Presented by Community Foundation Boulder County.

Personal life 
Rupert's husband is Richard Rupert. In 1960, Rupert and her family moved to Boulder, Colorado. They have two children.

In 2001, Rupert's husband had a stroke and later had Alzheimer's Disease. While Rupert lived in Colorado, her husband was relocated to a nursing home in Louisiana.

References

External links 
 Dorothy Rupert at votesmart.org
 Dorothy Rupert at strongsisters.org
 Dorothy Rupert at facebook.com
 Dorothy Rupert: Neguse will represent best in all of us

Living people
20th-century American politicians
21st-century American politicians
Colorado state senators
Women state legislators in Colorado
21st-century American women politicians
1926 births
20th-century American women politicians